St Peter the Apostle High School is a Roman Catholic high school in Drumry, Clydebank, Scotland. It was formed as an amalgamation of the former St Columba's High School and St Andrew's High School. St Peter the Apostle High School is one of two Roman Catholic secondary schools in West Dunbartonshire.

St Peter the Apostle High School is a Roman Catholic comprehensive school serving the northern part of Clydebank, the village of Duntocher, Faifley, Hardgate and the Drumchapel area of Glasgow. Students come in substantial numbers from Old Kilpatrick, Knightswood and Scotstoun. Five primary schools provide the great majority of the first-year intake including; St Mary's Primary School, St Joseph's Primary School, St Eunan's Primary School, St Stephen's Primary School, and St Clare's Primary School, although a variety of others add to this number.

History
In 2009, West Dunbartonshire Council started a project with Bam construction to create new schools in the area. The previous Catholic secondary schools in Clydebank, St Columba's High School and St Andrew's High School were to be merged to form the new school, the campus for which was built on the sports grounds of St Columba's to allow the existing school to operate during construction of the new building. After the opening of St Peter the Apostle High School, the former St Columba's High School building was demolished, with the new St Eunan's Primary School built on this site. The cost to build the new school was £35m.

The school was shown on the 2012 BBC show Kevin Bridges: What's the Story? in the episode "School", in which comedian Kevin Bridges (a former pupil of St Columba's High School) visited and performed a gig before an audience of students and teachers.

Michael Vassie retired as head teacher of the school in 2013 after being in that position since St Peter the Apostle High was created, having been the head at St Andrew's since 1995. Former Deputy Linda Booth succeeded him and is the current head teacher of the school.

In the past, Clydebank high and St. Peter’s have been known for their feuds with one another, resulting in pupils ringing each other's fire alarms. Fire alarms are quite common in St. Peter’s. In the month of September 2022 the fire alarm went off an astonishing 8 times.

Head Teachers
 Mr. Michael Vassie: 2009-2013
 Mrs. Linda Booth: 2013–Present

Departments
St Peter the Apostle High School currently comprises eighteen distinct departments each offering a variety of curricular subjects. The school is notable as it is the only high school currently in West Dunbartonshire to feature a Drama Department. The school takes a different and unique approach to Inter-Disciplinary Learning (IDL) as it is a timetabled mandatory subject for years 1-4, as opposed to being experienced throughout the year at individual school events as it is done throughout other schools in West Dunbartonshire.

 Maths
 English
 Physics
 Chemistry
 Biology
 Modern Studies
 History
 Geography
 politics 
 Computing
 Business Management
 Home Economics
 Design and Engineering
 Art, Design, and Photography
 Drama
 Music
 Modern Languages
 Religious Education (RE)
 Physical Education (PE)

References

External links
 Official website

Catholic secondary schools in West Dunbartonshire
Clydebank
2009 establishments in Scotland
Educational institutions established in 2009